Pyrene punctata, common name : the telescoped dove shell, is a species of sea snail, a marine gastropod mollusk in the family Columbellidae, the dove snails.

Description
The shell size varies between 14 mm and 26 mm

Distribution
This species is distributed in the Western Pacific and along Australia.

References

External links
 

Columbellidae
Gastropods described in 1789